DTE Electric Company (formerly The Detroit Edison Company) was founded in 1886.

DTE Electric's power generation portfolio includes renewable energy, but is primarily generated by fossil fuels. In 2021, 67.32% of electricity generated by DTE came from coal, gas, and oil. The regional average fossil fuel mix was 62.84%. As of 2021, DTE's emission levels of Carbon Dioxide, Sulfur Dioxide, Nitrogen Oxides, and High-Level nuclear waste are higher than regional averages.

History 

Detroit Edison was part of a large holding company called North American Edison Company. North American's stock had once been one of the twelve component stocks of the May 1896 original Dow Jones Industrial Average. North American Company was broken up by the Securities and Exchange Commission, following the United States Supreme Court decision of April 1, 1946.

After that, Detroit Edison operated independently, and publicly traded on the New York Stock Exchange under the ticker symbol DTE through the mid-1990s. In early 1996, it became an operating subsidiary of the new holding company, DTE Energy Company, which replaced Detroit Edison Company on the stock exchange, and took over the trading ticker symbol.

Power generation

Fossil Generation

Fossil Fuel Plants 
Current operating DTE Energy's coal and natural gas power plants:

In 2016, DTE Energy announced the retirement of three coal-fired generating units among its plants by 2023. The plants are located in River Rouge, St. Clair in East China Township and Trenton. In sum, the plants power around 900,000 homes. The Detroit Free Press wrote that employees at the closing plants will be able to transfer to other facilities and will not lose their jobs. 

River Rouge Power Plant's retirement was expedited to 2021 with its last megawatt produced on May 31, 2021 and formally retired on June 4, 2021.

Trenton Channel Power Plant and St. Clair Power Plant retired in 2022, replaced by renewable energy projects. 

Many of DTE Energy's coal plants were built in the 1950s and 1960s and "are nearing retirement age."

Blue Water Energy Center 
In 2018, the Michigan Public Service Commission approved Blue Water Energy Center, a natural gas combined-cycle plan. This will replace three retiring coal plants, reducing carbon emissions by 70 percent, and provide power to 850,000 homes.

Blue Water Energy Center began commercial operation on June 6, 2022.

Nuclear 

DTE currently operates one nuclear plant, Enrico Fermi Nuclear Generating Station, generating 21% of DTE Electric's power.

Renewable 
Since 2009, DTE has driven investment of $2.8 billion in renewable energy assets, increasing to $4.8 billion by 2024.

Since April 2021, DTE Electric operates 18 wind and 31 solar parks, totaling 1,760 megawatts of clean energy, powering 670,000 homes.

Wind 
DTE currently has 18 operational wind parks in their portfolio.

As the state’s largest investor in and producer of wind energy, DTE produces enough energy from renewable sources to power more than 500,000 homes.

Solar 
DTE currently operates 31 solar parks in Michigan.

In May 2016, the company broke ground on a solar array project in Lapeer, Michigan touted as the largest utility-owned solar array east of the Mississippi River. Lapeer Solar Park generates enough electricity to power 9,000 homes. DTE Energy also operates a 10-acre solar installation in Detroit on the site of the abandoned O'Shea Park.

Hydro 
DTE and Consumers Energy co-own the Ludington Pumped Storage Plant on Lake Michigan in Mason County, Michigan.

Landfill-based gas-to-energy operations 
In May 2017, DTE Energy announced it had acquired "two landfill-based gas-to-energy operations" in Texas. The company wants to expand its operations to alternative vehicle fuel. The operations it acquired were the Fort Bend Power Producers, LLC facility outside of Rosenberg, Texas and the Seabreaze landfill gas development in Angleton, Texas, which has yet to be developed.

After these projects are operational, the company will have five "landfill conversion facilities which capture and convert dangerous landfill gases to pipeline-quality renewable natural gas". The gases will go to fueling transit buses.

Electric cars 
In July 2018, DTE Energy filed a proposal to invest $13 million into an electric car charging program. The program would upgrade transformers and also include service drops, materials, hardware, new meters and other costs. The program is called Charging Forward program and would also provide consumers rebates.

Energy transmission 

As a condition of electric utility deregulation in Michigan, DTE Energy was forced to sell off Detroit Edison's sister subsidiary involved in high-voltage energy transmission: International Transmission Co. (ITC).

Energy distribution 
Detroit Edison's near 11-gigawatt generating capacity is offered to its  service area, which encompasses 13 counties in the southeastern portion of the lower peninsula.

Detroit Edison's distribution line voltages are three-phase 4,800 volts (Delta) 4,800/8,320 volts (wye) and 7,620/13,200 volts (Wye) . All new distribution circuits constructed after 1959 are 13,200 volts. The 8,320 volt distribution lines are located in Pontiac, Michigan in an area that was served by Consumers Power Company until the mid-1980s when the area was acquired by Detroit Edison. Edison's subtransmission line voltages are 24,000 volts and 41,600 volts.

DTE Rail Service Inc. 
With the bankruptcy of the Penn Central Transportation railroad in 1970, Detroit Edison sought to continue transporting coal from the Monongahela mines in Pennsylvania to a brand new power plant in Monroe, Michigan. However, the bankruptcy of Penn Central left Detroit Edison short of motive power and under capacitated coal hoppers. Detroit Edison then chose to purchase brand new locomotives and coal cars to fit their needs. Purchasing EMD SD40's and GE U30C's for mainline motive power as well as High-Side Articulated Gondolas (with a capacity of 185,000 pounds), this new equipment allowed Detroit Edison to move more coal en masse than what Penn Central was able to do with their equipment. The trains were maintained by Detroit Edison officials but operated by Penn Central crews.

By the late 1980s or early 1990, Detroit Edison discontinued use of their equipment, as Conrail began to supply enough locomotives and rolling stock to meet the power company's needs.

References

 Detroit Edison Railroad Roster
 Detroit Edison Railroad Information

External links

Electric power companies of the United States
Energy in Michigan
Historic American Engineering Record in Michigan
Hydroelectric power companies of the United States
Nuclear power companies of the United States
Companies based in Detroit
Energy companies established in 1903
Non-renewable resource companies established in 1903
1903 establishments in Michigan